The Pioneer Single Member Constituency is a Single Member Constituency in the western part of Singapore. The current Member of Parliament for the constituency is People's Action Party (PAP) Patrick Tay.

Town Council

Pioneer SMC is managed by the West Coast Town Council.

Members of Parliament

Electoral results

Elections in 2010s

Elections in 2020s

References 
2020 General Election's result
2011 General Election's result

Singaporean electoral divisions
Pioneer, Singapore